Wouter Verstraaten (born 10 March 1996) is a Dutch footballer. Besides the Netherlands, he has played in the United States and England.

Biography
Verstraaten enrolled at Durham University in September 2019 as a postgraduate sport scholar in the business school, and in addition to playing for the university football team also made appearances for Consett and South Shields – signing a full-time contract for the latter in May 2020.

Career statistics

Club

Notes

References

External links
 Wouter Verstraaten at the University of the Pacific

1996 births
Living people
Alumni of Grey College, Durham
Dutch footballers
Association football defenders
Pacific Tigers men's soccer players
Eerste Divisie players
USL League Two players
Northern Football League players
Northern Premier League players
Vierde Divisie players
PSV Eindhoven players
FC Eindhoven players
Portland Timbers U23s players
Consett A.F.C. players
South Shields F.C. (1974) players
Achilles Veen players
Dutch expatriate footballers
Dutch expatriate sportspeople in the United States
Expatriate soccer players in the United States
Dutch expatriate sportspeople in England
Expatriate footballers in England